The Purple Violet Stakes is an American Thoroughbred horse race run annually during the first week of September at Arlington Park in Arlington Heights, Illinois, though now it runs in July. Open to three-year-old fillies registered in the State of Illinois, the non-graded stakes is contested at a distance of one mile (8 furlongs) on Polytrack synthetic dirt.

Inaugurated in 1976, it was known as the Colfax Maid Stakes until 1997.

Since inception it has been contested at various distances:
 6.5 furlongs : 1976-1978
 7 furlongs : 1979-1987, 1990-1994
 8 furlongs : 1988-1989, 1995-present

It was run in two divisions in 1984. there was no race run in 1998 and 1999.

Winners

References
 The 2009 Purple Violet Stakes at Arlington Park.com

Ungraded stakes races in the United States
Flat horse races for three-year-old fillies
Recurring sporting events established in 1976
Arlington Park
1976 establishments in Illinois